The Pinzón brothers were Spanish sailors, pirates, explorers and fishermen, natives of Palos de la Frontera, Huelva, Spain. Martín Alonso, Francisco Martín and Vicente Yáñez, participated in Christopher Columbus's first expedition to the New World (generally considered to constitute the discovery of the Americas by Europeans) and in other voyages of discovery and exploration in the late 15th and early 16th centuries.

The brothers were sailors along the coast of Huelva, and thanks to their many commercial voyages and piracy along the coast, they were famous along the entire coast. The strategic position offered by the historic Atlantic port of Palos, from which expeditions had set forth to the African coasts as well as to the war against Portugal, for which most of the armadas set forth from this town, organized, on many occasions, by this family.

Martín Alonso and Vicente Yáñez, captains of the caravels La Pinta and La Niña, respectively on Columbus's first voyage, are the best known of the brothers, but the third brother, the lesser-known Francisco Martín, was aboard the Pinta as its master.

It was thanks to Martín Alonso that the seamen of the Tinto-Odiel were motivated to participate in Columbus's undertaking. He also supported the project economically, supplying money from his personal fortune.

Francisco, master of the Pinta, appears to have participated in Columbus's third and fourth voyages of discovery as well as in the first, but because his name was a common one, the facts of his life cannot be easily sorted out from those of contemporaries with the same name.

Vicente Yáñez, the youngest of the three brothers, besides participating in Columbus's first voyage, once Columbus's monopoly on transatlantic trade was ended, made several voyages to the Americas on his own account and is generally credited with the discovery of Brazil.

Although they sometimes quarreled with Columbus, on several occasions the Pinzón brothers were instrumental in preventing mutiny against him, particularly during the first voyage. On 6 October, Martín intervened in a dispute between Columbus and the crew by proposing an altered course (which Columbus eventually accepted) and thus calmed simmering unrest. A few days later, on the night of 9 October 1492, the brothers were forced to intercede once again, and this time they proposed the compromise that if no land was sighted during the next three days, the expedition would return to Spain. On the morning of the 12th, land (there is some question of the location: see Guanahani) was in fact sighted by Juan Rodriguez Bermejo (also known as Rodrigo de Triana).

The port of Palos at the end of the 15th century 
The Pinzón brothers lived in the era of the greatest splendor of the port town of Palos de la Frontera, participating in the majority of the activities undertaken by that port.

The historic port of Palos was a river port, protected from winds and from pirate attacks, both major hazards to the ports of the time. The port probably grew simultaneously with the town, first as an anchorage for small vessels engaged almost exclusively in fishing on the beaches and estuaries and occasional commercial transactions to supply the small population.

For many, the expression port of Palos brings to mind the present-day port with its old wharf, the muelle de la Calzadilla from which the Plus Ultra flying boat departed in 1926 to cross the Atlantic. This is not the 15th century port. The municipal ordinances of the era (Ordenanzas Municipales de Palos (1484–1521)), focused mainly on regulating the town's maritime activities never use the terms puerto (port) or muelle (wharf). The caravels of Palos "arrived at the riverbank" ("aportaban a la ribera"), where they discharged their goods and auctioned their fish. That is to say, the activities of the port were not conducted in any single place, but along the length of the bank of the Río Tinto, because of the large number of ships and relatively high volume of merchandise they had to handle.

Progressively, the river became Palos's principal means of connection to the outside world and the port the axis of its relation to the surrounding towns. This maritime orientation modified the shape of the town, previously a conical area centered around the church and castle. The Calle de la Ribera ("Riverbank Street") connecting the town center to the port became the town's principal artery, and the port the authentic heart of the local economy.

The caravels anchored in the center of the river, where the depth was sufficient for their drafts, and paid for the rights to anchor there. From the caravels, boats and dinghies loaded or unloaded the goods "tying up to the shore" ("amarrando en la ribera"). The port had a population density similar to that to the town proper, from what we can deduce from the Ordenanza Municipal, which prohibited weapons on the riverbank because the people there were as tightly packed as in the town proper (the expression used is "tan aparejadas como en la Villa": aparejadas is nautical Spanish for something that has been furnished or supplied). Beginning in the first third of the 15th century, the port of Palos experienced continual economic growth, obtaining an importance well beyond the local area and achieving even international dimensions, as is testified by the frequent presence of English, Breton, Flemish, and Italian ships.

Following in the wake of the Portuguese, the ships of Palos traveled to the Canary Islands and Guinea, with their rich fisheries and the commercial possibility of trade in gold, spices, and slaves. In the second half of the 15th century, Palos reaches a population of three thousand. The alota of Palos, a type of customs warehouse, paid the largest tribute of any such facility to the Duke of Medina Sidonia, its primacy being such that it fishermen were recruited from other towns along the coast and two residents of Palos. Juan Venegas and Pedro Alonso Cansino, were placed in charge of giving licenses to fish in the Afro-Atlantic waters from Cabo Bojador to the Río de Oro, which they leased from the Catholic Monarchs Isabella and Ferdinand.

The Pinzón family of Palos 
The Pinzón family were one of the leading families of 14th-century Palos. The family may have come originally from the Kingdom of Aragón, but arrived in Andalusia either from la Montaña (now Cantabria) or from Asturias. According to some historians, this surname could have been a corruption of Espinzas or Pinzas ("tweezers"). Others say that the true family name was Martín, a widespread name with a long tradition in the area, the name of their grandfather, a sailor and diver in Palos, who was dubbed Pinzón when he went blind; that, combined with his hobby of singing gave him the nickname Pinzón, the Spanish word for chaffinch, because owners of chaffinches sometimes blinded them, supposedly making them sing more beautifully. His son, also a sailor named Martín Pinzón, was the father of the three Pinzón brothers. Their mother was named Mayor Vicente, so the three were full brothers and bore the surnames Pinzón and Vicente (see Spanish naming customs).

Martín Alonso Pinzón 

Martín Alonso Pinzón (c. 1441 – c. 31 March 1493) was the oldest of the brothers, and captain of the Pinta on Columbus's first voyage.

It appears that at quite a young age he shipped out on a locally based caravel as a grumete (cabin boy). His home, now the Casa Museo de Martín Alonso Pinzón, was on the old royal road to the Monastery of La Rábida. Martín's family contracted a marriage with a resident of the locality named María Álvarez. They had five children: two sons—Arias Pérez and Juan Pinzón, who participated in several expeditions to the Americas—and three daughters—Mayor, Catalina, and Leonor. Leonor, the youngest, suffered frequent attacks of what was then called "gota coral" and would now be called epilepsy.

His nautical experience and his leadership remained patent in the 1508–1536 lawsuits known as the pleitos colombinos, where the witnesses indicated him as the leader of the comarca (a region comparable to a shire). He was also famous for his battles against the Portuguese in the War of the Castilian Succession. It is probable that even while in Portugal before coming to Spain, Columbus was aware of Martín Alonso, because he was known for his participation in the war, as well as for his incursions into the Canary Islands and Guinea.

He was captain of the Pinta on Columbus's first voyage and supplied half a million ("medio cuento") maravedís in coin toward the cost of the voyage. Thanks to his prestige as a shipowner and expert sailor and his fame throughout the Tinto-Odiel region, he was able to enlist the crew required for Columbus's first voyage.

On 23 May 1492 the royal provision was read out to the residents of Palos, by which the Catholic Monarchs ordered that certain residents deliver two caravels to Columbus and travel with him on his voyage that he was making "by command of Their Highnesses" ("por mandado de Sus Altezas") and that the town should respect the royal decision. However, the locals did not comply. The sailors of Palos had no confidence in embarking on this adventure with Columbus, who was largely unknown to them. Independent of their greater or lesser credence in his ideas, the men of Palos found it difficult to support the Genovese sailor if he was not accompanied by a mariner known and respected in the town. The venture—risky and, above all, of uncertain profit—did not present great attractions. Opposition or indifference to Columbus's project was general.

The Franciscans of the Monastery of La Rábida put Columbus in touch with Martín Alonso Pinzón. Pero Vázquez de la Frontera, an old mariner in the town—very respected for his experience, and a friend of Martín Alonso—also had an important influence on the oldest Pinzón brother deciding to support the undertaking, not only morally but also economically. Martín Alonso dismissed the vessels that Columbus had already seized based on the royal order and also dismissed the men he had enrolled, supplying the enterprise with two caravels of his own, the Pinta and the Niña, which he knew from his own experience would be better and more suitable boats. Furthermore, he traveled through Palos, Moguer and Huelva, convincing his relatives and friends to enlist, composing of them the best crew possible. He captained the caravel Pinta, from which Rodrigo de Triana was to be the first person to sight American soil.

Columbus, in his diary, spoke favorably of Pinzón on several occasions. Nonetheless, after they had discovered the West Indies, the relationship between the two changed radically from 21 November 1492, when Martín Alonso separated from Columbus. Admiral Columbus launched a series of accusations of desertion against Pinzón and his brothers, including Vicente who had saved him when the Santa María was shipwrecked. Nonetheless, much of the testimony in the pleitos colombinos, as well as part of the specialized historiography and investigators, does not agree that these things happened in this manner, nor is there any accusation against Pinzón in Columbus's Letter on the First Voyage, which Columbus wrote on his return.

For Martín Alonso the return voyage was lethal, as the ships suffered from a great storm, which resulted in great fatigue and exhaustion, accumulated over many days of sailing. Because of this, Martín's recurrent fevers from which he suffered reactivated and he died a few days after returning from the New World. In fact, he was taken from his ship in a stretcher and, as Columbus arrived, his friends took him to a farm that was on the boundary between Palos and Moguer. It is possible that Martín's son, Arias Pérez Pinzón, did not bring him directly to his house in Palos in order to protect him, given that Columbus had threatened him earlier. Another possibility is that this was because Martín did not get along well with Catalina Alonso, the woman who had been living with his father since he became a widower, and with whom the father would have two illegitimate children: Francisco and Inés Pinzón. According to testimony, he was brought to the La Rábida Monastery, where he died; he was entombed there, as was his wish.

Francisco Martín Pinzón 
Francisco Martín Pinzón (c. 1445 – c. 1502) was the second of the brothers. On Columbus's first voyage he was the master (second only to the captain) of the Pinta, the first ship to sight land in the Americas. Although he was less known than his two brothers, he played a major role both in voyages of discovery and in service to the Crown.

His personal and family story is confused, because several relatives shared this same name, frequently leading historians to confuse them. Nonetheless, he seems to have been married to Juana Martín and to have had at least one daughter, who we find documented as "an orphan" and "poor" ("huérfana y pobre").

With his brother Vicente, he made several voyages to Italy and Africa in service to the Crown. In November 1493, together with Juan de Sevilla, Rodrigo de Quexo, and Fernando Quintero, he led an assault on the Algerian coast. In 1496 he brought money and supplies to the Spanish troops fighting in Naples. Later, he participated in Columbus's third and fourth voyages, on the last of which, according to his companion on many voyages, Rodrigo Álvarez, he died by drowning.

Vicente Yáñez Pinzón 

Vicente Yáñez Pinzón (c. 1462 – c. September 1514) was the youngest brother. He was captain of the Niña on the first voyage of discovery. He later made other discoveries on his own account; historians consider him the discoverer of Brazil along with his cousin Diego de Lepe.

Considerably younger than his brothers, it is likely that his name Yáñez came from Rodrigo Yáñez, a bailiff (alguacil) of Palos who would then have been his godfather, according to the custom of the place. Tradition in Palos indicates that he lived on the Calle de la Ribera. From a young age, he learned the art of navigation from his oldest brother, and from adolescence he participated in combat and in military assaults, as he happened to reach this age during the War of the Castilian Succession.

He married twice, first to Teresa Rodríguez, with whom he had two daughters, Ana Rodríguez and Juana González. After his final return from the Yucatán in 1509 he married Ana Núñez de Trujillo, with whom he lived in Triana (across the river from Seville), probably until his death.

The first we hear of Vicente Yáñez is when he is denounced for assaults on Aragonese boats, some with his oldest brother, when he was only 15 years old. This was between 1477 and 1479, during the War of the Castilian Succession (with Portugal) in which Palos participated actively and through which its habitual shortage of grain was aggravated: its residents complained of hunger. Royal orders to various places that were supposed to supply Palos with cereals were disobeyed. The Pinzón brothers, taking on their responsibilities as natural leaders of the district, attacked caravels that were transporting mainly grain.

Vicente immediately supported his brother, Martín Alonso, when Martin decided to back Columbus's undertaking. The two worked together to enlist men from the Tinto-Odiel for the risky voyage. He was chosen as captain of the Niña and distinguished himself during the voyage. This involved, among other accomplishments, helping to put down several attempts at mutiny together with his older brother. He provided support, both to Columbus and the rest of the crew, after the Santa María was wrecked. With his flagship gone, the admiral made his return voyage in the Niña, captained by Vicente, who provided all the help necessary for a successful return voyage.

He made several more expeditions to the Americas, the most important being the voyage to the mouth of the Amazon which constituted the discovery of Brazil, in early 1500. That expedition was an economic failure. In 1505 he was made the governor of Puerto Rico. Later, in 1506, he returned to the Caribbean to search for a passage to the Pacific Ocean. He explored all of the Caribbean coast of Central America and the Yucatan Peninsula.

According to the chronicler Gonzalo Fernández de Oviedo y Valdés, Vicente Yáñez died in 1514, probably at the end of September. It is not known precisely where he is buried, but Oviedo states that it is somewhere in the cemetery of Triana.

The Pinzón brothers and the discovery of America 

The participation of the Pinzón brothers was crucial to Columbus's first voyage, especially in that few were disposed to enlist with Columbus until Martín Alonso, a wealthy and famous shipbuilder in the Tinto-Odiel region, gave his support to the enterprise. Once Martín Alonso gave his support, he undertook a veritable campaign on behalf of the undertaking. His support and that of his brothers and of other distinguished families of mariners in the region served to recruit the necessary crew: sailors from Palos, Huelva, and even from beyond Andalusia. The testimony in the pleitos colombinos indicates that the Pinzón brothers, above all Martín:
 Among these other families, the Niño brothers of Moguer stand out: their prestige and influence brought the men of Moguer to unite around the enterprise.

During the voyage of discovery, they demonstrated on several occasions their gifts as expert mariners and as leaders, in that they knew how to master the most diverse and difficult situations. For example, they were able to continue sailing, even after the damage that occurred to the Pinta when the tiller broke, before they reached the Canary Islands, and when, between 6 and 7 October 1492 Columbus was unable to reestablish discipline among the tired and discouraged crew of the Santa María, Martín Alonso with his gift of command managed to resolve the situation. Martín Alonso suggested to Columbus the change of course on 6 October 1492; A few days later, on 9 October he proposed a compromise that won a few more days from the restless crew. The course he urged brought the expedition to landfall on Guanahani on 12 October 1492. When the Santa María wrecked on 25 December, Vicente Yáñez in command of the Niña went to the rescue of those left in this difficult situation.

For these and other acts, the Pinzón brothers have a very notable place in the history of the discovery of America, and are considered by historians as "co-discoverers of America", in that without their help, support, and courage, Columbus probably could not have achieved his enterprise of discovery, at least not in that time and place.

Other voyages 
Although the oldest of the Pinzón brothers, Martín Alonso, died a few days after returning from Columbus's first voyage, that was by no means the end of the participation of the Pinzóns in voyages of discovery and other sea journeys.

Francisco and Vicente made various voyages to Italy and Africa in service to the Crown. As mentioned above, in November 1493, Francisco, along with Juan de Sevilla, Rodrigo de Quexo, and Fernando Quintero, led an assault on the Algerian coast. In 1496 they brought money and supplies to the Spanish troops fighting in Naples. In 1498 he participated in Columbus's third voyage, in which for the first time the Admiral arrived on the continent of South America.

Later in 1498, the Crown decided to end Columbus's monopoly on voyages of discovery. The series of voyages by other mariners are generally known as the "minor voyages" or the "Andalusian voyages" of discovery. After contracting with the crown, on 19 November 1499 Vicente left the port of Palos with four small caravels, crewed largely by his relatives and friends, among them his brother Francisco and also the famous physician of Palos Garcí Fernández, an early supporter of Columbus's first voyage. On this voyage, they discovered Brazil and the Amazon River.

On 5 September 1501 the Crown signed an agreement with Vicente in which, among other things, he was named Captain and Governor of the Cabo de Santa María de la Consolación, later Cabo de Santo Agostinho.

In 1502, Francisco traveled with Columbus on his fourth and final voyage; it is on this voyage he is believed to have died by drowning.

Vicente continued to travel back and forth across the Atlantic to fulfill his obligations as Captain General and Governor. He also participated as one of the experts brought together by the Crown in the Junta de Navegantes in Burgos in 1508 to take up anew the subject of the search for a passage to the Spice Islands. On his final voyage, along with captain Juan Díaz de Solís, he followed the coasts of Darién, Veragua and the Gulf of Paria, now Venezuela, Colombia, Panama, Costa Rica, Nicaragua, Honduras and Guatemala. Not finding the desired passage, he rounded the Yucatan Peninsula and entered into the Gulf of Mexico to the extent of 23.5º north latitude, bringing about one of the first European contacts with the Aztec civilization.

Upon returning from this voyage, Vicente Yáñez married for the second time and settled in Triana. In 1513 he testified against Columbus in the pleitos colombinos. In 1514 he was ordered to accompany Pedrarias Dávila to Darién, but he was not well enough and begged to be excused. That was on 14 March 1514, and it is the last primary source document in which he is mentioned.

Coat of arms granted by Charles I of Spain 
In 1519 a petition to Charles I of Spain, headed by Juan Rodríguez Mafra, requested the grant of a coat of arms to the Pinzóns and other mariners of Palos, exposing the lamentable situation of the descendants of those mariners who had offered such service to the Crown. The king finally conceded to the Pinzóns, their descendants and family members a coat of arms consisting of a shield with three caravels, natural, on the sea; from each a hand points to an island representing the first land discovered in the New World. Around that, a border with anchors and crowns.

See also
Lugares colombinos
List of explorers
Juan de la Cosa
Columbian Exchange or The Grand Exchange

Notes

References
 
 
  Online at archive.org
 
  The link is to an abridged copy on Google Books.

Further reading
 
 
 
 
 
 
 
 
 
 

Spanish explorers
Christopher Columbus